Tserenbaataryn Khosbayar (born 4 August 1965) is a Mongolian wrestler. He competed in the men's freestyle 48 kg at the 1992 Summer Olympics.

References

External links
 

1965 births
Living people
Mongolian male sport wrestlers
Olympic wrestlers of Mongolia
Wrestlers at the 1992 Summer Olympics
Place of birth missing (living people)
Asian Games bronze medalists for Mongolia
Asian Games medalists in wrestling
Wrestlers at the 1990 Asian Games
Medalists at the 1990 Asian Games
20th-century Mongolian people
21st-century Mongolian people